Castellar de Santiago is a municipality in the province of Ciudad Real, Castile-La Mancha, Spain. It has a population of 2,213.

References

Municipalities in the Province of Ciudad Real